Mang Jose is a 2021 Philippine superhero comedy film written by Mark Joseph Papa and directed by Raynier Brizuela. It stars Janno Gibbs, Mikoy Morales, Bing Loyzaga, Manilyn Reynes and Jerald Napoles. The film is inspired by a Parokya ni Edgar song of the same title.

Plot
It always pays to be good. And for superhero-in-hiding Mang Jose, it is quite literal. Having the ability of energy absorption & redirection, he covertly saves people only if they rent him out.

One day, carefree young man Tope rents Mang Jose to help him save his mother who has been abducted by mysterious troopers of King Ina, an enigmatic cunning villainess who is out there to annihilate all remaining superheroes in hiding.

Little do Mang Jose and Tope know the quest would lead them into paying the terrible price in order to save the priceless truth binding them: family.

Cast
 Janno Gibbs as Mang Jose
 Mikoy Morales as Tope
 Bing Loyzaga as Tina
 Manilyn Reynes as King Ina
 Jerald Napoles as Charlemagne
 Leo Martinez as Marcelo
 Gab Lagman as Lance
 Leo Bruno as Lando
 Ronaldo Valdez as Super Lapu-Lapu
 Michael V. as Kumander Andres
 Kim Molina as Sultana Kudarat
 Andrew E. as Mount Apolinario
 Lito Lapid as Inkredibol Diego
 Yassi Pressman as Gabriela Maginaw
 Tads Obach as Tope's Friend
 Edna Vida as Aling Ida
 Princess Izha Feliciano as King ina's Daughter
 Milo Elmido Jr. as Front Desk Officer
 James Caraan as TV Pageant Host
 Alwyn Uytingco as Lance (voice)
 John Kyle Rosales as Turbo Rat
 Raymond Villaraza as Chinese Thug
 Raffy Samoranos as Chinese Thug
 Charmaine Alovera as Cappuccino Girl
 Axel Fernandez as Bar Bully
 Nathaniel Pelareja as Bar Bully
 Mareck Jingco as Bar Bully
 Janzeil Siachongco as Cemetery People
 Nyle Libranza as Cemetery People
 Emmanuel Dela Cruz as Cemetery People

Release
The film premiered at Bucheon International Fantastic Film Festival on July 11, 2021, and it was released at the Philippines on November 17, 2021. The film was originally set for theatrical release.

Reception
JE CC of LionhearTV rate the film 3 out of 5 and wrote:

Soundtrack

 Mang Jose
Composed and written by Chito Miranda (as Chito Miranda Jr.)
Interpreted by Parokya ni Edgar
Published and administered by Universal Records, Inc.

 Mang Jose
Composed and written by Chito Miranda (as Chito Miranda Jr.)
Interpreted by Axel Fernandez
Published and administered by Runt Collective.

 Mang Jose
Composed and written by Chito Miranda (as Chito Miranda Jr.)
Interpreted by Janno Gibbs
Published and administered by Universal Records, Inc.

 Halina Kay King Ina
Arranged by Axel Fernandez
Performed by Aimee Grace Bautista
Published and administered by Runt Collective
Used with permission.

References

External links
 
  

Philippine comedy films
Philippine science fantasy films
Philippine superhero films